Blathmac mac Con Brettan was an Irish poet and monk whose floruit was around 760.

Blathmac was the son of Cú Brettan mac Congussa (died 740), seemingly a king of the Airthir, one of the Airgíalla kingdoms, situated in modern-day County Armagh. His brother Donn Bó was killed in battle in 759. Cú Brettan and Donn Bó both appear as characters in the saga Cath Almaine and are portrayed as poets.

Blathmac was educated in a monastic school and went on to become a monk. A manuscript containing his surviving poems, two meditations on the Virgin Mary, Tair cucum a Maire boid and A Maire, a grian ar clainde, once in the possession of Mícheál Ó Cléirigh, is in the National Library of Ireland, where it was re-discovered by Nessa Ní Shéaghdha in 1953.

Art historian Peter Harbison says that st some point, Blathmac probably visited Rome as much of his poems reflect scenes depicted on mosaics in old Roman churches.

References

Sources
 Robert Welch, Oxford Concise Companion to Irish Literature, 1996. 
 James Carney, "Language and literature to 1169" in Dáibhí Ó Cróinín (ed.), A New History of Ireland. Volume I: Prehistoric and Early Ireland, 2005. 
 James Carney, 'The poems of Blathmac, son of Cú Brettan: together with the Irish Gospel of Thomas and a poem on the Virgin Mary'.  Irish Texts Society, London 1964
 Siobhán Barrett and David Stifter, 'Blathmac’s stanzas 260–303 on Judgement Day', Celtica 31 (2019): 19‒89.
 Edward O'Reilly, A Chronological Account of Nearly Four Hundred Irish Writers, Dublin, 1820 (reprinted 1970)
 Brian Lambkin, "Blathmac and the Céili Dé: a reappraisal", Celtica 23, 1999
 Brian Lambkin, 'The Structure of the Blathmac Poems', Studia Celtica 20–21, 1985–6, 76–77.
 Nessa Ní Shéaghdha, 'The poems of Blathmhac: the ‘fragmentary quatrains', Celtica 23 (1999): 227–230.
 David Stifter, 'The Language of the Poems of Blathmac' (Online)

8th-century Irish poets
Irish Christian monks
People from County Monaghan
Irish male poets
Irish-language writers